Nick Oudendag (born 23 April 1987) is a Dutch former basketball player. During his career, Oudendag was a member of the Netherlands national team.

Professional career
He has played most of his career with the Dutch team Matrixx Magixx, as he had 5 different stances with the team from Nijmegen and Wijchen. In September 2014, Oudendag signed a contract with the Bosnian team KK Igokea. However, he was released quickly. In January 2015, he signed a contract with the German ProA team ETB Wohnbau Baskets.

In August 2016, he signed with Landstede Basketbal. In June 2017, New Heroes Den Bosch signed Oudendag to a two-year contract.

National team career
Oudendag also plays for the Dutch national team, he was selected for the squad in 2009 and 2014. He was one of the key players for the team that qualified for Holland's first FIBA EuroBasket tournament in 25 years. Oudendag averaged 10 points and 8.3 rebounds per game during the 2015 qualifying rounds. Oudendag was not selected for the EuroBasket 2015 team.

References

External links
 
 FIBA.com profile

1987 births
Living people
Antwerp Giants players
Centers (basketball)
Den Helder Kings players
Dutch men's basketball players
Matrixx Magixx players
Heroes Den Bosch players
Feyenoord Basketball players
People from Zevenaar
ETB Wohnbau Baskets players
Sportspeople from Gelderland
Dutch expatriate basketball people in Germany
Dutch expatriate basketball people in Belgium